Deutscher Science Fiction Preis is a German literary award. Together with the Kurd-Laßwitz-Preis, it is one of the most prestigious awards for German science fiction literature. Each year, the award is given to the best German science fiction short story and the best German novel from the previous year.

Winners

Best Novel 
1985: Herbert W. Franke, Die Kälte des Weltraums 
1986: Thomas R. P. Mielke, Der Tag an dem die Mauer brach
1987: Claus-Peter Lieckfeld/Frank Wittchow, 427 - Im Land der grünen Inseln  und Friedrich Scholz, Nach dem Ende
1988: Gudrun Pausewang, Die Wolke
1989: Fritz Schmoll, Kiezkoller
1990: Maria J. Pfannholz, Den Überlebenden
1991: Herbert W. Franke, Zentrum der Milchstraße
1992: Christian Mähr, Fatous Staub
1993: Herbert Rosendorfer, Die Goldenen Heiligen
1994: Dirk C. Fleck, GO! Die Ökodiktatur
1995: Gisbert Haefs, Traumzeit für Agenten
1996: Andreas Eschbach, The Carpet Makers
1997: Andreas Eschbach, Solarstation
1998: Robert Feldhoff, Grüße vom Sternenbiest
1999: Andreas Eschbach, Jesus Video
2000: Matthias Robold, Hundert Tage auf Stardawn
2001: Fabian Vogt, Zurück
2002: Oliver Henkel, Die Zeitmaschine Karls des Großen
2003: Oliver Henkel, Kaisertag
2004: Andreas Eschbach, Der Letzte seiner Art
2005: Frank Schätzing, The Swarm
2006: Wolfgang Jeschke, Das Cusanus-Spiel
2007: Ulrike Nolte, Die fünf Seelen des Ahnen
2008: Frank W. Haubold, Die Schatten des Mars
2009: Dirk C. Fleck, Das Tahiti-Projekt
2010: Karsten Kruschel, Vilm. Der Regenplanet / Vilm. Die Eingeborenen
2011: Uwe Post, Walpar Tonnraffir und der Zeigefinger Gottes
2012: Karsten Kruschel, Galdäa. Der ungeschlagene Krieg
2013: Andreas Brandhorst, Das Artefakt
2014: Wolfgang Jeschke, Dschiheads
2015: Markus Orths, Alpha & Omega: Apokalypse für Anfänger
2016 Andreas Brandhorst, Das Schiff
2017 Dirk van den Boom, Die Welten der Skiir 1: Prinzipat
2018 Marc-Uwe Kling, Qualityland
2019 Tom Hillenbrand, Hologrammatica
2020 Bijan Moini, Der Würfel

Best Short Story 
1985: Thomas R. P. Mielke, Ein Mord im Weltraum
1986: Wolfgang Jeschke, Nekyomanteion
1987: Reinmar Cunis, Vryheit do ik jo openbar
1988: Ernst Petz, Das liederlich-machende Liedermacher-Leben
1989: , Der Käse
1990: Gert Prokop, Kasperle ist wieder da!
1991: Andreas Findig, Gödel geht
1992: Egon Eis, Das letzte Signal
1993: Norbert Stöbe, 10 Punkte
1994: Wolfgang Jeschke, Schlechte Nachrichten aus dem Vatikan
1995: Andreas Fieberg, Der Fall des Astronauten
1996: Marcus Hammerschmitt, Die Sonde
1997: Michael Sauter, Der menschliche Faktor
1998: Andreas Eschbach, Die Wunder des Universums
1999: Michael Marrak, Die Stille nach dem Ton
2000: Michael Marrak, Wiedergänger
2001: , Ein Plädoyer
2002: Michael K. Iwoleit, Wege ins Licht
2003: Arno Behrend, Small Talk
2004: Michael K. Iwoleit, Ich fürchte kein Unglück
2005: Karl Michael Armer, Die Asche des Paradieses
2006: Michael K. Iwoleit, Psyhack
2007: Marcus Hammerschmitt, Canea Null
2008: Frank W. Haubold, Heimkehr
2009: Karla Schmidt, Weg mit Stella Maris
2010: Matthias Falke, Boa Esperança
2011: Wolfgang Jeschke, Orte der Erinnerung
2012: Heidrun Jänchen, In der Freihandelszone
2013: Michael K. Iwoleit, Zur Feier meines Todes
2014: Axel Kruse, Seitwärts in die Zeit
2015: Eva Strasser, Knox
2016: Frank Böhmert, Operation Gnadenakt
2017: Michael K. Iwoleit, Das Netz der Geächteten
2018: Uwe Hermann, Das Internet der Dinge
2019: Thorsten Küper, Confinement
2020: Tom Turtschi, Don’t Be Evil

See also
 Kurd-Laßwitz-Preis

References

External links 
 Deutscher Science Fiction Preis site (German)

German science fiction awards
German literary awards